Following are the results of the 1998 ABN AMRO World Tennis Tournament doubles competition. The 1998 ABN AMRO World Tennis Tournament was a tennis tournament played on indoor carpet courts. It was the 26th edition of the event known that year as the ABN AMRO World Tennis Tournament, and was part of the ATP International Series of the 1998 ATP Tour. It took place at the Rotterdam Ahoy indoor sporting arena in Rotterdam, Netherlands, from March 2 through March 18, 1998.

Jacco Eltingh and Paul Haarhuis were the defending champions, and won in the final 7–6, 6–3, against Neil Broad and Piet Norval.

Seeds

  Jacco Eltingh /  Paul Haarhuis (champions)
  Neil Broad /  Piet Norval (final)
  Martin Damm /  Jiří Novák (semifinals)
  Joshua Eagle /  Andrew Florent (first round)

Draw

Draw

Qualifying

Qualifying seeds

Qualifiers
  Tom Kempers /  Menno Oosting

Qualifying draw

References

External links
 Official results archive (ATP)
 Official results archive (ITF)

Doubles
1998 ATP Tour